Zhangjiakou railway station (Formerly Zhangjiakou South railway station) is a railway station of Jingbao Railway, Zhangji Railway and Beijing–Zhangjiakou intercity railway located in Zhangjiakou, Hebei, China.

History

The station was constructed in 1956 and officially opened in 1957. It belongs to the Beijing Railway Administration and the Beijing-Baotou Railway railway routes.

The line is the terminus of the Beijing–Zhangjiakou intercity railway, the Zhangjiakou–Hohhot high-speed railway and the Zhangjiakou–Datong High-Speed Railway.

Reconstruction
As of November 12, 2017, the railway station, which had been operating for 60 years on the Beijing-Baotou Railway, was officially closed down in preparation for the new Beijing–Zhangjiakou intercity railway. Passenger trains that had originally arrived and stopped at the station were all transferred to Zhangjiakou South railway station. It was re-opened on December 30, 2019.

Renaming of the station
On March 3, 2019, the station was renamed to Zhangjiakou railway station, and what was known as Shalingzi West railway station is now known as Zhangjiakou South railway station.

See also
List of stations on Jingbao railway

References

Notes

External links

Railway stations in Hebei
Railway stations in China opened in 1957